Ellis Theo Rasmussen (September 21, 1915 – June 6, 2011) was an American professor and dean of Religious Instruction at Brigham Young University (BYU).  He helped produce the edition of the Bible published by the Church of Jesus Christ of Latter-day Saints (LDS Church) in 1979.

Biography
Born to Wilford and Kate Nelson Rasmussen.

As a young man in the 1930s, Rasmussen attended Snow College in Ephraim, Utah, where he was forensic manager of the student body and received an associates degree in education.

In the 1940s, Rasmussen married Oda Fonnesbeck.  They had five children and resided in Orem, Utah. Rasmussen died at his home on June 6, 2011.

Church service

In 1939 Rasmussen served as a missionary for the LDS Church in the West German Mission.  When the German borders were closing during the onset of World War II, Rasmussen led several missionaries in an escape to Denmark, then back to the United States.  He completed his missionary service in the Southern States Mission, where he served as mission secretary.

Throughout his life Rasmussen served in the LDS Church, including as a bishop, high councilor, counselor in a stake presidency, temple ordinance worker, and Stake Patriarch in Orem, Utah.

Education
After his mission, in 1942, Rasmussen received his bachelor's degree from BYU.  That fall, he went to Weston, Idaho to teach in high school and LDS Church seminary.  During the summer, he continued graduate work at BYU under his mentor, Sidney B. Sperry, who urged him to study Old Testament languages.  Sperry helped Rasmussen become a part-time teacher at BYU in 1949.  This helped him complete his master's degree in 1951 and then begin teaching full-time at BYU.

With Sperry's encouragement, a sabbatical leave grant, and a private donation,  Rasmussen pursued doctoral studies in the language and literature of the Old Testament at Dropsie College for Hebrew and Cognate Learning, in Philadelphia, Pennsylvania from 1957–58.  He completed his Ph.D. at BYU in 1967, with his dissertation entitled "Relationship of God and Man According to a Text and Targum of Deuteronomy".

Career
Rasmussen taught at BYU for over thirty years.  By the 1960s he was chair of the Biblical Languages Department, followed by chair of the Ancient Scripture Department, and Assistant Dean of Religious Instruction. In 1976, Rasmussen became dean of Religious Instruction and Director of BYU's Religious Studies Center, replacing Jeffrey R. Holland who had left to become Commissioner of Church Education.  In 1981, Rasmussen stepped down from these positions and was replaced by Robert J. Matthews.  He received the Division Faculty Teaching Award from the BYU Division of Continuing Education in 1980, and was retired from teaching by the mid-1980s.

At BYU Rasmussen had been an early member of the Society for Early Historic Archaeology in 1949, where he served on its advisory committee and as symposium chairman in 1972.  He also spent time in Israel for BYU as a leader of travel study tours and Special Representative.

Rasmussen assisted several significant LDS Church publishing efforts.  In the 1970s he served on the church's Correlation Committee  and on a committee to assist the church's Ensign magazine with scriptural articles.  Being skilled in Hebrew, Rasmussen was given leave from his administrative duties at BYU during 1973–74 to work on the church's Scripture Publication Committee that produced the 1979 LDS edition of the Bible.  He later also assisted in developing the 1981 LDS editions of the Doctrine and Covenants and Pearl of Great Price.  He contributed articles on the Old Testament to the 1992 Encyclopedia of Mormonism and participated in the encyclopedia's final editing.

Rasmussen has been described as among the LDS scholars familiar with "biblical languages and modern critical methodology" seeking academic credibility, yet "dogmatic" and "apologetic" in their support of traditional LDS orthodoxy.

Writings

Rasmussen authored the LDS Church's 1965 Sunday School manual on the Old Testament, and his best known work is A Latter-day Saint Commentary on the Old Testament, published in 1993.

Books

Articles

Papers

.
.
.
.

.

.

Notes

1915 births
20th-century Mormon missionaries
American Latter Day Saint writers
American Mormon missionaries in the United States
Brigham Young University alumni
Brigham Young University faculty
Church Educational System instructors
American Mormon missionaries in Germany
Patriarchs (LDS Church)
People from Orem, Utah
Snow College alumni
Dropsie College alumni

Writers from Utah
2011 deaths
American leaders of the Church of Jesus Christ of Latter-day Saints
Latter Day Saints from Utah
Latter Day Saints from Idaho
Latter Day Saint biblical scholars